The Sudanese gubernatorial elections took place on 11–15 April 2010, alongside the wider Sudanese general election, to elect the Governors of the states of Sudan.

The election produced few unexpected upsets, with NCP candidates winning all Northern States, and SPLM candidates winning all of Sudan's Southern States with the notable exception of Western Equatoria; where an Independent candidate unseated the incumbent SPLM Governor.

Changes to the constitution in January 2015 meant that Governors are now appointed by the President, as opposed to being directly elected.

The only state not to hold elections was South Kordofan, where elections were delayed due to disagreement over disputes arising from the 2008 census.

Votes by State

References

Elections in Sudan
2010 elections in Africa
2010 in Sudan
Gubernatorial elections in Sudan